Mittal is a surname in India. Notable people with the surname include:
Aditi Mittal (born 1985), Indian stand-up comedian
Aditya Mittal (born 1974), Indian businessman
Ajay Kumar Mittal (born 1958), former chief justice of Madhya Pradesh, Meghalaya, and Punjab/Haryana high courts
Alok Mittal (born 1969), IPS Officer and Policeman
Anil Mittal (born 1973), Indian-American investment banker
Ankur Mittal (born 1992), Indian sport shooter
Anoop Kumar Mittal (born 1960), Chairman and Managing Director of NBCC
Ashok Mittal (born 1964), Indian businessman and politician
Chhavi Mittal (born 1980), Indian Actress
Gita Mittal (born 1958), first female judge of the Jammu and Kashmir High Court
Gopal Mittal (1906–1993), Indian poet, writer, critic and journalist
Kavin Bharti Mittal, Indian internet entrepreneur, son of Sunil Mittal
Lakshmi Mittal (born 1950), Indian industrialist
Lakshman Das Mittal, Indian industrialist, founder of Sonalika Group, billionaire
Madan Mohan Mittal (born 1939), Indian politician from Punjab
Madhur Mittal (born 1988), Indian actor 
Mehar Mittal (1934–2016), Indian actor and film producer
Megha Mittal (born 1976), Indian businesswoman
Neena Mittal, Indian politician
Neeraj Mittal (born 1967), Principal Secretary of Tamil Nadu's Information Technology Department
Pramod Mittal (born 1956), chairman of Ispat Industries Limited, younger brother of Lakshmi Mittal
Rajan Mittal (born 1960), Indian businessman, vice chairman and managing director of Bharti Enterprises
Rajat Mittal (born 1967), researcher and medical engineering professor at Johns Hopkins University
Rajnish Kumar Mittal (born 1974), President of Municipal Council Nabha
Sanjay Mittal, Indian aerospace engineer
Sat Paul Mittal (1931–1992), Indian politician, father of Sunil Mittal
Satish Chandra Mittal (born 1938), retired Indian history professor
Som Mittal, Indian businessman
Sudhanshu Mittal, Indian politician
Sunil Bharti Mittal (born 1957), founder of (telecom company) Bharti Airtel.
Sumeet Hukamchand Mittal (born 1974) Indian screenwriter, producer, director and entrepreneur (founder of Shashi Sumeet Productions)
Vinay Mittal (born 1953), Indian Civil Servant